
Anthedon was a Hellenistic city near Gaza.

Site and archeology 
It has been identified with Tida or Theda, a site near Beit Lahiya known from medieval Arab sources. Immediately to the north of it there is a hill still called Teda; the name seems to be a corruption of "Anthedon". Some parts of the city wall are still standing, and port structures are visible: they were explored by a Franco-Palestinian archaeological expedition between 1995 and 2005, under the direction of Father Jean-Baptiste Humbert. Potsherds have also been found in the dunes.

On April 2, 2012, the ancient city was listed as a tentative World Heritage Site by Palestine. In 2013, the Izz ad-Din al-Qassam Brigades, the military wing of Hamas, bulldozed part of the harbour to expand its military training zone. The Deputy Minister of Tourism in Gaza, Muhammad Khela, said the site would not be damaged by the expansion, despite criticism from local activists and the UNESCO office in Gaza.

History 
Located between Gaza and Ascalon, the city served as the port of Gaza. It was inhabited from the Mycenaean era to the early Byzantine age, but it was during the Hellenistic period that the port northwest of Gaza, populated by immigrants from Anthedon, Boeotia, became an independent city under the name Anthedon. As a Greek city, it had an agora and temples. The citizens' life was chiefly dedicated to fishing and shipbuilding. The city was governed by a Council of 500 members and had its own army commanded by a strategos.

Anthedon is first mentioned by Flavius Josephus in Jewish Antiquities, dealing with the period when it was conquered by the Jewish leader Alexander Jannaeus and destroyed. In 64 BC, it was liberated by Pompey and subsequently rebuilt by his successor Gabinius. Later, Anthedon along with coastal Province Judea passed into the hands of Cleopatra and then to Augustus, who assigned it to Herod. Herod renamed the city Agrippias in honor of Agrippa, a Roman general and son-in-law of Octavian Augustus. During the "Jewish War" (66–70 AD), the religious faction of the Zealots attacked Anthedon, but the attack was successfully repelled and the city remained Hellenistic.

It was important enough in the Roman province of Palestina Prima to become a suffragan bishopric of its capital's Metropolitan Archbishop of Caesarea in Palestina, but later faded.

Ecclesiastical history 
In the 4th century AD, the city became an episcopal seat, though traditional multitheism, particularly the worship of Venus and Astarte, survived there until the 5th century according to Sozomenus. The latter informs us about one Zenon, brother of the martyrs Nestabus and Eusebius - who were martyred in 362 AD as a result of prosecution by Julian the Apostate - who fled to Anthedon. The pagan townsfolk, upon learning that he was a Christian, beat him and drove him out of town. Later on, this Zenon went on to become bishop of Maiuma of Gaza.

A celebrated Christian figure was Aurelius the Anthedonian who was known to be pious and helped spread Christianity in the area.

The first known bishop of Anthedon was Paul, who took part in the Councils of Ephesus (431) and Chalcedon (451). Bishop Eustathius took part in the Council of Jerusalem (518), and Bishop Dorotheus in the Council of Jerusalem (536).

Titular see 
Anthedon is no longer a residential bishopric and is listed by the Catholic Church as a titular bishopric.

It has been vacant for decades. Notable incumbents, all of the lowest (episcopal) rank, include:
 Marcel-François Lefebvre, Holy Ghost Fathers (C.S.Sp.) (1947.06.12 – 1948.09.22), Apostolic Vicar of the then Dakar (Senegal) (1947.06.12 – 1955.09.14), later Apostolic Administrator of Saint-Louis du Sénégal (Senegal) (1948 – 1955.09.14), Titular Archbishop of Arcadiopolis in Europa (1948.09.22 – 1955.09.14), Apostolic Delegate (papal diplomatic envoy) to all of French Africa (1948.09.22 – 1959.07.09), Metropolitan Archbishop of Dakar (Senegal) (1955.09.14 – 1962.01.23), Archbishop-Bishop of Tulle (France) (1962.01.23 – 1962.08.11), Superior General of Congregation of the Holy Spirit (Spiritans, Holy Ghost Fathers) (1962.07.26 – 1968.09), Titular Archbishop of Synnada in Phrygia (1962.08.11 – 1970.12.10), Founder of Society of Saint Pius X (1970.11.01) and its first Superior General (1970.11.01 – 1982), thus is disputed communion with the Holy See

See also 
 Syro-Palestinian archaeology

References

Sources and external links
 GigaCatolic, with titular incumbent biography links

Anthedon
Former populated places in the State of Palestine
Iron Age Greek colonies
Hellenistic colonies
Populated places in ancient Palestine